December Avenue is an album by Polish jazz trumpeter and composer Tomasz Stańko's New York Quartet which was recorded in 2016 and released on the ECM label the following year. The album is dedicated to Polish writer Bruno Schulz.

Reception

The Allmusic review by Thom Jurek said "December Avenue is a more deliberate outing than its predecessor, but it's also more intuitive ... As individuals and as a collective, these musicians stay focused on whatever the tune is trying to say. What's more, each player is careful to leave space for his bandmates, not only in solos, but in fills and harmonic feints and shifts. Assembled, this not only makes for a compelling listen, but also reveals the maturity and confidence this quartet has developed since the release of Wisława". Writing in The Guardian, John Fordham observed "A terrific successor to 2013’s Wislawa, this is just as exquisite an exercise in haunting tone-poetry, occasionally pierced by urgent avant-swing". The All About Jazz review by Karl Ackermann said that "December Avenue is strikingly balanced and tastefully performed by this well synergized quartet." The JazzTimes review by Thomas Conrad states "It is not wise to designate one Stanko album as more beautiful than the others. But December Avenue reaches layers within modern consciousness where even Stanko has not been".

Track listing
All compositions by Tomasz Stańko except where noted
 "Cloud" – 4:13
 "Conclusion" (Stańko, David Virelles, Gerald Cleaver, Reuben Rogers) – 2:01
 "Blue Cloud" – 8:52
 "Bright Moon" – 7:19
 "Burning Hot" – 5:05
 "David and Reuben" (Stańko, Virelles, Cleaver, Rogers) – 1:30
 "Ballad for Bruno Schulz" – 6:26
 "Sound Space" (Stańko, Virelles, Cleaver, Rogers) – 4:04
 "December Avenue" – 6:33
 "The Street of Crocodiles" – 6:08
 "Yankiels Lid" – 6:07
 "Young Girl in Flower" – 5:57

Personnel
Tomasz Stańko - trumpet
David Virelles - piano
Reuben Rogers - bass
Gerald Cleaver - drums

References

ECM Records albums
Tomasz Stańko albums
2017 albums
Albums produced by Manfred Eicher